Hiroki Nakajima (中島 弘貴, born July 5, 1988) in Tokyo, Japan is a Japanese welterweight kickboxer fighting out of Tokyo, Japan for the Bungeling Bay gym.  He is the 2009 Krush middleweight tournament champion and 2010 K-1 World MAX Japan runner up.

Biography / Career

Nakajima began his kickboxing career in 2006 with the Shoot Boxing organization, winning all four of his fights.  In 2009 after fighting for a number of promotions he joined Krush and won their "Road to MAX" 70 kg tournament at the end of the year.  As Krush was a feeder league for K-1 MAX, champion Nakajima qualified for the following year's K-1 World MAX Japan tournament.

He went into the competition on a hot winning streak, having won all eleven of his fights, an impressive seven by KO.  At the tournament in Saitama Nakajima made his way to the final, stopping both of his opponents including a 0:58 second knockout of fellow prospect Hinata Watanabe.  In the final he faced Yuichiro Nagashima in what was an entertaining match with both fighters going all out in their quest for victory.  In the second round Nakajima managed to knock down Nagashima but was unable to press home his advantage, losing in the third by knockout.  Despite the first ever loss on his record, Nakajima's performance at the tournament earned him a call up to the K-1 World MAX 2010 Final 16 - Part 1 where he lost his elimination fight to 2002 MAX champion Albert Kraus.

He scored a first-round knockout over KEN at Krush Ignition vol. 4 in Tokyo, Japan on June 2, 2013.

He lost to Yoichi Yamazaki via extension round split decision on August 11, 2013, at Krush.30.

Titles
Krush
 2009 Krush "Road to MAX" -70kg Tournament Winner
 2015 Krush -70 kg Champion

K-1
 2010 K-1 World MAX 2010 -70kg Japan Tournament runner up

It's Showtime
 2012 It's Showtime Japan -70 kg Champion

Fight record

|-  style="text-align:center; background:#fbb"
| 2022-10-16|| Loss ||align=left| Kuntap Charoenchai|| KNOCK OUT 2022 vol.6 || Tokyo, Japan || Decision (Majority) || 3 || 3:00
|-  style="text-align:center; background:#cfc"
| 2022-07-23|| Win ||align=left| Ryoki || KNOCK OUT 2022 vol.4 || Tokyo, Japan || TKO (Referee stoppage) || 4 ||1:22
|-  style="text-align:center; background:#cfc"
| 2022-04-17|| Win ||align=left| Khonreach || KNOCK OUT 2022 vol.3 || Tokyo, Japan || KO (Right cross) || 2 ||0:25
|-  style="text-align:center; background:#cfc;"
| 2022-01-22|| Win ||align=left| Shuhei Sone || KNOCK OUT 2022 vol.1 || Tokyo, Japan || KO (3 Knockdowns) || 1||1:21
|-  style="text-align:center; background:#cfc;"
| 2021-10-29|| Win ||align=left| Yojiro Hiratsuka || KNOCK OUT 2021 vol.5  || Tokyo, Japan || Decision (Unanimous)  || 3||:300
|-  style="background:#cfc;"
| 2021-07-18|| Win ||align=left| Saksith || KNOCK OUT 2021 vol.3 || Tokyo, Japan || TKO (Punches) || 1 ||
|-  bgcolor="#FFBBBB"
| 2019-11-02 || Loss ||align=left| Song Shaoqiu || Wu Lin Feng 2019: WLF -67kg World Cup 2019-2020 6th Group Stage || Zhengzhou, China || Decision (Unanimous) || 3 || 3:00
|-  bgcolor="#FFBBBB"
| 2019-06-23 || Loss ||align=left| Kaito || Shoot Boxing 2019 act.3 || Tokyo, Japan || TKO (Jumping knee) || 4 || 2:55
|-
|-  bgcolor="#FFBBBB"
| 2018-01-27 || Loss ||align=left| Katsuya Jinbo || Krush 84 || Tokyo, Japan || Decision (Unanimous)|| 3 || 3:00
|-
|-  bgcolor="#FFBBBB"
|2017-06-18 || Loss ||align=left| Chingiz Allazov || K-1 World GP 2017 Super Middleweight Championship Tournament, Quarter Finals || Tokyo, Japan || KO (Left Uppercut) || 2 || 1:18
|-  bgcolor="#CCFFCC"
| 2017-03-03|| Win ||align=left| Yoichi Yamazaki|| Krush 74|| Japan || KO (Jumping knee) || 2 || 2:00 
|-
|-  bgcolor="#CCFFCC"
| 2017-01-15|| Win ||align=left| Hiromi Wajima|| Krush 72|| Japan || Decision (Majority) || 3 || 3:00
|-  bgcolor="#CCFFCC"
| 2016-09-21|| Win ||align=left| Kotetsu  || Krush 69 || Japan || Decision (unanimous) || 3 || 3:00
|-  bgcolor="#fbb"
| 2016-04-10|| Loss ||align=left| Jordann Pikeur || Krush 65 || Tokyo, Japan || Decision (unanimous) || 3 || 3:00 
|-
! style=background:white colspan=9 |
|-  bgcolor="#CCFFCC"
| 2015-11-21 || Win ||align=left| Dmitrii Grafov || K-1 World GP 2015 The Championship || Tokyo, Japan || Decision (unanimous) || 3 || 3:00 
|-
|-  bgcolor="#cfc"
| 2015-10-04 || Win||align=left| Yutaro Yamauchi || Krush.59 || Tokyo, Japan || Decision (Unanimous)|| 3 || 3:00 
|-
! style=background:white colspan=9 |
|-  bgcolor="#FFBBBB"
| 2015-07-04 || Loss ||align=left| Sanny Dahlbeck || K-1 World GP 2015 -70kg Championship Tournament, Quarter Finals || Tokyo, Japan || TKO (2 knockdowns/Punches) || 2 || 2:01 
|-
|-  bgcolor="#cfc"
| 2015-04-12 || Win||align=left| Yoichi Yamazaki || Krush.53 || Tokyo, Japan || Decision (Unanimous)|| 3 || 3:00 
|-
! style=background:white colspan=9 |
|-  bgcolor="#CCFFCC"
| 2015-02-06 || Win ||align=left| Shintaro Matsukura || Krush 51 || Tokyo, Japan || Decision (Unanimous)|| 3 || 3:00
|-  bgcolor="#FFBBBB"
| 2014-10-25 || Loss ||align=left| Sen Bunthen || THAI FIGHT KING OF MUAY THAI 2014 || Bangkok, Thailand || Decision || 3 || 3:00
|-  bgcolor="#FFBBBB"
| 2014-04-15 || Loss ||align=left| Yasuhiro Kido || Krush.40 || Tokyo, Japan || Decision (Unanimous)|| 3 || 3:00 
|-
! style=background:white colspan=9 |
|-  bgcolor="#CCFFCC"
| 2014-01-04 || Win ||align=left| Un Pyo Ha || Krush 37|| Tokyo, Japan || TKO (Flying knee) || 3 || 1:44
|-  bgcolor="#CCFFCC"
| 2013-10-30 || Win ||align=left| Taisei Kondo|| Krush-IGNITION 2013 vol.7|| Tokyo, Japan || TKO (Knee to the body) || 3 || 1:01
|-  bgcolor="#FFBBBB"
| 2013-06-02 || Loss ||align=left| Yoichi Yamazaki || Krush.30 || Tokyo, Japan || Ext.R Decision (split) || 4 || 3:00 
|-
|-  bgcolor="#CCFFCC"
| 2013-06-02 || Win ||align=left| KEN || Krush Ignition vol. 4 || Tokyo, Japan || KO || 1 || 
|-
|-  bgcolor="#FFBBBB"
| 2013-03-20 || Loss ||align=left| Yutaro Yamauchi || Krush.27 || Tokyo, Japan || KO (Right hook)|| 2 || 1:10
|-  bgcolor="#fbb"
| 2012-07-29 || Loss ||align=left| Henri van Opstal || REBELS.12 & It's Showtime Japan Countdown-2 || Tokyo, Japan || Decision (majority) || 3 || 3:00
|-  bgcolor="#cfc"
| 2012-01-22 || Win||align=left| Danilo Zanolini|| REBELS.10 || Tokyo, Japan || Decision (Unanimous) || 5 || 3:00 
|-
! style=background:white colspan=9 |
|-  bgcolor="#FFBBBB"
| 2011-09-25 || Loss ||align=left| Takafumi Morita|| K-1 World MAX 2011 -70kg Japan Tournament Final, Quarter Final || Osaka, Japan || Decision (Unanimous) || 3 || 3:00 
|-
|-  bgcolor="#fbb"
| 2011-07-16 || Loss||align=left| Kenta || Krush inaugural -70 kg Championship Tournament, Semi Final || Tokyo, Japan || Decision (Unanimous) || 3 || 3:00
|-  bgcolor="#CCFFCC"
| 2011-05-29 || Win ||align=left| YOSHI || Krush 70 kg Tournament Opener, Quarter Finals  || Tokyo, Japan || KO (Jumping knee)|| 3 || 0:50 
|-
|-
! style=background:white colspan=9 |
|-
|-  bgcolor="#FFBBBB"
| 2010-12-30 || Loss ||align=left| Buakaw Por. Pramuk || World Victory Road Presents: Soul of Fight || Tokyo, Japan || Decision (Unanimous) || 3 || 3:00 
|-
|-  bgcolor="#FFBBBB"
| 2010-07-05 || Loss ||align=left| Albert Kraus || K-1 World MAX 2010 Final 16 - Part 1 || Tokyo, Japan || Decision (Unanimous) || 3 || 3:00 
|-
! style=background:white colspan=9 |
|-
|-  bgcolor="#FFBBBB"
| 2010-03-27 || Loss ||align=left| Yuichiro Nagashima || K-1 World MAX 2010 Japan, Final || Saitama, Japan || KO (Right Hook) || 3 || 1:58 
|-
! style=background:white colspan=9 |
|-
|-  bgcolor="#CCFFCC"
| 2010-03-27 || Win ||align=left| Hinata || K-1 World MAX 2010 Japan, Semi Finals || Saitama, Japan || KO (Right Hook) || 1 || 0:58 
|-
|-  bgcolor="#CCFFCC"
| 2010-03-27 || Win ||align=left| Tatsuji || K-1 World MAX 2010 Japan, Quarter Finals || Saitama, Japan || KO (Punch Rush) || 2 || 0:43 
|-
|-  bgcolor="#CCFFCC"
| 2009-11-02 || Win ||align=left| Yutaro Yamauchi || Krush Lightweight GP 2009 Final Round, "Road to MAX" Final || Tokyo, Japan || 2nd Ext.R Decision (Unanimous) || 5 || 3:00 
|-
! style=background:white colspan=9 |
|-
|-  bgcolor="#CCFFCC"
| 2009-09-22 || Win ||align=left| Hiroshi Sannai || Krush 4, "Road to MAX" Semi Finals || Tokyo, Japan || Decision (Unanimous) || 3 || 3:00 
|-
! style=background:white colspan=9 |
|-
|-  bgcolor="#CCFFCC"
| 2009-08-14 || Win ||align=left| Daisuke Tsutsumi || Krush Lightweight GP 2009 Final 16, Super Fight || Tokyo, Japan || Ext.R Decision (Unanimous) || 4 || 3:00 
|-
|-  bgcolor="#CCFFCC"
| 2009-05-17 || Win ||align=left| Tomo Kiire || A.J.K.F. "Krush 3" || Japan || TKO (Corner Stoppage) || 3 || 2:33 
|-
|-  bgcolor="#CCFFCC"
| 2009-03-14 || Win ||align=left| Kazunori "POPEYE" Kagebi|| A.J.K.F. "Krush 2" || Japan || KO || 2 || 0:41 
|-
|-  bgcolor="#CCFFCC"
| 2008-11-30 || Win ||align=left| 73King || R.I.S.E. 51 || Tokyo, Japan || Decision (Unanimous) || 3 || 3:00 
|-
|-  bgcolor="#CCFFCC"
| 2008-10-31 || Win ||align=left| KOUHEI || The Smoker's Halloween || Tokyo, Japan || KO || 1 || 1:07
|-  bgcolor="#CCFFCC"
| 2007-10-28 || Win ||align=left| Takuo Tsukamoto || Shoot Boxing Battle Summit Ground Zero || Tokyo, Japan || TKO (Corner Stoppage) || 2 || 0:30 
|-
|-  bgcolor="#CCFFCC"
| 2007-09-30 || Win ||align=left| Kenji Matsumoto || Shoot Boxing Warriors 2007 MU-SO 4 || Tokyo, Japan || Ext.R KO (Left Hook) || 2 || 2:49 
|-
|-  bgcolor="#CCFFCC"
| 2007-07-29 || Win ||align=left| Takashi Hishida || Shoot Boxing Warriors 2007 MU-SO 3 || Tokyo, Japan || TKO (3 Knockdowns/Right Hook) || 1 || 1:18 
|-
|-  bgcolor="#CCFFCC"
| 2006-09-23 || Win ||align=left| Keisuke Nobata || WSBA "Shoot Boxing 2006 Neo ΟΡΘΡΟΣ Series 5th" || Tokyo, Japan || KO (Knee) || 2 || 1:20 
|-
|-
| colspan=9 | Legend:

See also
List of male kickboxers
List of K-1 Events

References

External links
K-1 OFFICIAL WEBSITE | Hiroki Nakajima | FIGHTERS

1988 births
Living people
Japanese male kickboxers
Welterweight kickboxers
Sportspeople from Tokyo